Edward Alkśnin (born 2 October 1954) is a Polish judoka. He competed in the men's lightweight event at the 1980 Summer Olympics.

References

1954 births
Living people
Polish male judoka
Olympic judoka of Poland
Judoka at the 1980 Summer Olympics
Sportspeople from Grodno